The twenty-dollar note was first issued by the Oriental Bank Corporation from 1866 to 1884. These banknotes are not very common and are listed as extremely rare. Apart from this, the banknote was reintroduced in 1985 by the Standard Chartered Bank (Hong Kong) in green and yellow, followed by The Hongkong and Shanghai Banking Corporation in 1986 in similar colours, but more green involved. The Bank of China issued their version in 1994 as a blue coloured banknote. These were standardised in 2004 when all three types of banknotes were changed to a blue colour.

References

Ma Tak Wo 2004, Illustrated Catalogue of Hong Kong Currency, Ma Tak Wo Numismatic Co., LTD Kowloon Hong Kong. 

Banknotes of Hong Kong
Twenty-base-unit banknotes